Strombosia is a plant genus of about 10 species in the family Olacaceae. It has also been classified in the family Strombosiaceae. The generic name is from the Greek , meaning "pear-shaped", referring to the fruit.

Description
Strombosia species grow as shrubs or trees. The flowers are bisexual with 5 petals. The fruits are drupes (pitted) with a thin, fleshy pericarp.

Distribution and habitat
Strombosia species are distributed mostly in tropical Africa, with others in tropical Asia. Their habitat is typically lowland forests.

Species
, Plants of the World Online recognised 11 species:
 Strombosia ceylanica  
 Strombosia fleuryana  
 Strombosia gossweileri  
 Strombosia grandifolia  
 Strombosia nana 
 Strombosia javanica 
 Strombosia nigropunctata 
 Strombosia philippinensis 
 Strombosia pustulata 
 Strombosia scheffleri  
 Strombosia zenkeri

References

Olacaceae
Santalales genera